Milton Fernando Patiño Rosero (born 7 March 1973) is a Colombian football goalkeeper who plays for Fortaleza in the Categoría Primera B.

Club career
Patiño previously played for several clubs in the Copa Mustang, including Atlético Nacional and Deportivo Pasto. He joined Millonarios in January 2009, becoming the club's third goalkeeper.

Titles

References

External links
Profile at GolGolGol.net

1975 births
Living people
Footballers from Cali
Association football goalkeepers
Colombian footballers
Colombia international footballers
Atlético Nacional footballers
Atlético Junior footballers
Deportes Quindío footballers
Deportes Tolima footballers
América de Cali footballers
Deportivo Pasto footballers
Millonarios F.C. players
Fortaleza C.E.I.F. footballers